Denise Bouah (born 26 November 1980), formerly known as Denise Frick, is a South African chess player who holds the title of Woman International Master.

Biography
In 2003 Denise Frick became a Woman FIDE master (WFM), and in 2004 she received the title of Woman International master (WIM). In 2005, in Cape Town she won the Republic of South Africa Women's Chess Championship, and in Lusaka won a bronze medal in the African Women's Chess Championship. In 2011, in Maputo, she won a bronze medal (her second medal) in the African Women's Chess Championship. In 2012, in Khanty-Mansiysk she made her debut at the Women's World Chess Championship, where she lost in the first round to Humpy Koneru. In 2014 in Windhoek, she won in the FIDE zonal tournament of Africa.

She has represented South Africa in multiple Women's Chess Olympiads, including 2000, 2004, 2006, 2012, 2014, 2016, 2018) and 2022 and at the World Women's Team Chess Championship in 2011. She has participated three times in the Women's Chess Team tournament in the African Games (2003-2011), where she won two silvers (2003, 2007) and a bronze (2011) medal in the team competition, and in the individual competition she won the silver (2011) medal.

Frick is a psychologist by education. Her master's degree work a concerned the use of chess as a therapeutic tool for assisting in the treatment of substance abuse.

References

External links
  (archive)
 
  (archive)

1980 births
Living people
South African female chess players
South African psychologists
South African women psychologists
Chess Woman International Masters
Chess Olympiad competitors
African Games medalists in chess
African Games silver medalists for South Africa
African Games bronze medalists for South Africa
Competitors at the 2003 All-Africa Games
Competitors at the 2007 All-Africa Games
Competitors at the 2011 All-Africa Games
South African chess players
20th-century South African women
21st-century South African women